Sofiya Denisovna Andreeva (born 2 August 1998) is a Russian swimmer. She competed in the women's 200 metre breaststroke event at the 2016 Summer Olympics.

References

External links

1998 births
Living people
Russian female swimmers
Olympic swimmers of Russia
Swimmers at the 2016 Summer Olympics
Russian female breaststroke swimmers
Swimmers from Saint Petersburg